Ethernet Global Data (EGD) is a protocol that enables producer (server) to share a portion of its memory to all the consumers (clients) at a scheduled periodic rate. This protocol is developed for GE Fanuc PLCs to exchange data between PLCs / Drive Systems / HMI/SCADA systems. The protocol uses  UDP over Ethernet layers for exchanging the data. A snapshot of internal reference memory, mediated by an Ethernet interface, is referred to as an exchange. An exchange does not require a reply and is identified by a unique combination of three major identifiers.
 The Producer ID (the producer's IP address)
 The Exchange ID (the exchange's identifier)
 The Adapter Name (the Ethernet interface identifier)

EGD is implemented using classes.
 Class 0 - supports configured exchanges only (implemented in most PACSystems CPUs)
 Class 1 - supports all class 0 services plus programmed EGD exchanges that can be used to read and write other devices on an ad-hoc basis
 Class 2 - supports all class 1 services plus acts as a responder for programmed EGD exchanges (implemented by Ethernet interface module only)
 Class 3 - supports all class 2 services plus static configuration from an EGD configuration server
 Class 4 - supports all class 3 services plus dynamically bound configuration from an EGD configuration server

External links

Industrial computing
Industrial Ethernet